LLC, or Limited liability company, is the US-specific form of a private limited company.

LLC may also refer to:

Transport 
 LHD Landing Craft, Australian name for the LCM-1E landing craft
 Small Planet Airlines, ICAO code
 Cagayan North International Airport IATA code

Computing 
 Last level cache of the computer CPU cache
 Logical link control, part of computer networking data link layer

Sport 
 Legends League Cricket, a Twenty20 cricket league for recently retired international cricketers.

Other uses 
 Lapu-Lapu City, Philippines
 Laestadian Lutheran Church
 Laurentian Leadership Centre of Trinity Western University
 Lendlease Group, Australia, stock market symbol
 "LLC", a 2018 song by Nicki Minaj from the album Queen
 "LLC", a 2021 song by Money Man from the mixtape Blockchain